

Pa 
Pačerani, Pajići (municipality Prozor-Rama), Paljike (municipality Prozor-Rama), Paoča, Paraun, Parcani (municipality Prozor-Rama), Paroš (municipality Prozor-Rama), Parsovići

Pe 
Perjani,

Pi 
Pijesci (municipality Mostar), Pijestina, Pijevac

Pj 
Pješivac-Greda (municipality Stolac(BiH)), Pješivac-Kula (municipality Stolac(BiH))

Pl 
Plavuzi, Plesi, Ploča (municipality Prozor-Rama)

Po 
Počitelj, Poda, Podbor (municipality Prozor-Rama), Podgorani (municipality Mostar), Podgorje (municipality Mostar), Podgrađe, Podhomara, Podhranjen, Podhum, Podkozara Donja, Podkozara Gornja, Podmeljine, Podorašac, Podosoje (municipality Ravno), Podvelež (municipality Mostar),  Pokojište, Polje Bijela, Polog (municipality Mostar), Poplat (municipality Stolac(BiH)) (part), Poprati (municipality Stolac), Poratak, Potoci (municipality Mostar), Potpolje, Potrkuša, Požetva

Pr 
Prapratnica (municipality Neum), Prćavci, Prebilovci, Prenj (municipality Stolac), Previla, Previš (municipality Neum), Prevlje, Pribjenovići, Prigrađani (municipality Mostar), Prisoje (dio), Prisoje, Prolaz, Prosjek (municipality Ravno), Proslap (municipality Prozor-Rama), Prozor (grad), Pršeši

Lists of settlements in the Federation of Bosnia and Herzegovina (A-Ž)